Bjarne Håkon Hanssen (born 1 November 1962) is a Norwegian politician of the Labour Party who served Minister of Health and Social Care Services from 2008 to 2009, Minister of Labour and Social Inclusion from 2005 to 2008 and Minister of Agriculture from 2000 to 2001. On 8 October 2009 Hansen announced that he would step down as a minister when Stoltenberg's reshuffled cabinet would be put together. As a minister he was both liked for his down to earth attitude, but also received much criticism for statements like “People on benefit must get up in the morning”. He was also member of Parliament from 1997 to 2009 and county mayor of Nord-Trøndelag from 1995 to 1997.

Biography 
Hanssen graduated from Namsos Upper Secondary School in 1981 and from Levanger Teacher College in 1985. He worked within the psychiatric services before becoming administrative chief for Fosen municipality in 1989. He was first elected to the Nord-Trøndelag county council in 1983. In 1995 he was elected County Mayor, but was then elected to Storting two years later. In 2000 he was appointed Minister of Agriculture, serving until 2001. He became Minister of Labour and Social Inclusion in 2005; in June 2008 he was moved to the post of Minister of Health. He held said post until he announced that he would not stand for re-election in the 2009 and election and subsequently step down as minister.

References 

 

1962 births
Living people
Labour Party (Norway) politicians
Government ministers of Norway
Ministers of Agriculture and Food of Norway
Ministers of Health and Care Services of Norway
Members of the Storting
Politicians from Nord-Trøndelag
People from Namsos
21st-century Norwegian politicians
20th-century Norwegian politicians